Chapel in the Hills is a stave church located near Rapid City, South Dakota, United States.

History

The Chapel in the Hills was dedicated on July 6, 1969, as the home for the radio ministry of Lutheran Vespers.  Lutheran Vespers hosts such as, Richard A. Jensen were broadcast nationwide from this location in the Black Hills. The church is a special ministry of the South Dakota Synod of the Evangelical Lutheran Church in America. 

The Chapel in the Hills is an exact replica of the Borgund stave church in Norway. The Borgund stavkirke was built around the year 1150 and is considered the most completely preserved stave church still standing in Norway.

The Norwegian Department of Antiquities provided a set of blueprints of the Borgund church to be used in the construction of the Chapel in the Hills. The woodcarvings resulted from the combined effort by Norwegian woodcarver Erik Fridstrøm and Rapid City resident, Helge Christiansen.

The site includes an authentic log cabin museum that was built in 1876 by  Edward Nielsen, a Norwegian immigrant gold prospector from Hole, Ringerike, Norway. There is also a stabbur, a grass-roofed house, that serves as the visitor center and gift shop.

References

Other sources
Malmin, Olaf Gabriel Chapel in the Hills : A notable church structure in Rapid City, South Dakota (Rapid City, 1969)

External links

Official Website
Chapel in the Hills pictures

Ethnic museums in South Dakota
Landmarks in South Dakota
Museums in Pennington County, South Dakota
Norwegian migration to North America
Norwegian-American culture in South Dakota
Buildings and structures in Rapid City, South Dakota
Religious museums in the United States
Properties of religious function on the National Register of Historic Places in South Dakota
Tourist attractions in Rapid City, South Dakota
Norwegian-American museums
Churches completed in 1969
Churches in Pennington County, South Dakota
National Register of Historic Places in Pennington County, South Dakota
1969 establishments in South Dakota
Stave churches